Tieke, or saddlebacks, are two species of New Zealand bird of the family Callaeidae. 

Tieke may also refer to:

Tieke Kāinga, a small Māori community in New Zealand
Anna Tieke (1898–1938), a German communist